Bidadari Takut Jatuh Cinta is an Indonesian soap opera musical comedy drama produced by Amanah Surga Productions that airs daily on SCTV. The cast includes Umay Shahab, Gritte Agatha, Endy Arfian, Chantiq Schagerl, and Sharon Sahertian, with cameo appearances from actors from Indonesian films and television.

Cast 
 Umay Shahab as Guntur
 Gritte Agatha as Bintang
 Endy Arfian as Surya
 Hanggini Purinda Retto as Raisa
 Aldy Rialdy as Topan
 Chantiq Schagerl as Pelangi
 Sharon Sahertian as Bulan
 Ajil Ditto as Boy
 Jose Christian as Ray
 Bagas Dwi Rizqi Hidayat as Jay
 Fay Nabila as Mona
 Adzwa Aurell as Venus
 Mpok Atiek as Hepi
 Teddy Syah as Surya's father

References

External links 
  Synopsis Bidadari Takut Jatuh Cinta at Website SCTV

2014 Indonesian television series debuts
Musical television soap operas
Indonesian comedy television series
Indonesian drama television series
Indonesian television soap operas
2010s Indonesian television series
2010s television soap operas